In Unix-like and some other operating systems, the pwd command (print working directory) writes the full pathname of the current working directory to the standard output.

Implementations
Multics had a pwd command (which was a short name of the print_wdir command) from which the Unix pwd command originated. The command is a shell builtin in most Unix shells such as Bourne shell, ash, bash, ksh, and zsh. It can be implemented easily with the POSIX C functions getcwd() or getwd().

It is also available in the operating systems SpartaDOS X, PANOS, and KolibriOS. The equivalent on DOS (COMMAND.COM) and Microsoft Windows (cmd.exe) is the cd command with no arguments. Windows PowerShell provides the equivalent Get-Location cmdlet with the standard aliases gl and pwd.
On Windows CE 5.0, the cmd.exe Command Processor Shell includes the pwd command. 

 as found on Unix systems is part of the X/Open Portability Guide since issue 2 of 1987. It was inherited into the first version of POSIX.1 and the Single Unix Specification. It appeared in Version 5 Unix. The version of pwd bundled in GNU coreutils was written by Jim Meyering.

The numerical computing environments MATLAB and GNU Octave include a pwd 
function with similar functionality. The OpenVMS equivalent is show default.

*nix examples

Note: POSIX requires that the default behavior be as if the -L switch were provided.

Working directory shell variables
POSIX shells set the following environment variables while using the cd command:

 OLDPWD  The previous working directory (as set by the cd command).
 PWD  The current working directory (as set by the cd command).

See also
 Breadcrumb (navigation), an alternative way of displaying the work directory
 List of GNU Core Utilities commands 
 List of Unix commands
 pushd and popd

References

Further reading

External links

 
 
 
 
 
 
 
 

Multics commands
Unix SUS2008 utilities
Plan 9 commands
Inferno (operating system) commands
IBM i Qshell commands
File system directories